Xscape is a brand name for buildings developed by X-Leisure, now part of Land Securities. Typically they contain a real snow indoor ski slope, leisure facilities and related shops. , there are two members of the chain, located in Milton Keynes, Buckinghamshire and Castleford, Yorkshire (both in England). A former member in Scotland has been sold. Xscape Milton Keynes and Xscape Yorkshire were designed by FaulknerBrowns Architects.

Xscape Milton Keynes

Xscape Milton Keynes (Buckinghamshire) opened in July 2000 and is a major feature on the skyline of Central Milton Keynes as seen from the east. The front of the Xscape building is 44 metres high, making it the second tallest building in Milton Keynes after Mellish Court in Bletchley (Which is to be demolished in 2022, making Xscape the tallest building). Xscape Milton Keynes features a 170m long real-snow ski slope, a 16-screen cinema, a number of shops and restaurants, a casino and a trampoline park. An interesting point is the two large funnels on the front of the building are sometimes mistaken for lifts or part of the cooling system; in fact they are stairs.

Located directly behind the Xscape building is a large square structure that houses an indoor skydiving centre named 'iFLY' (previously known as 'Airkix' until September 2016).

Xscape Yorkshire
Xscape Yorkshire is in Glasshoughton, West Yorkshire and opened in October 2003 with a footprint of approx .

Xscape Yorkshire was a major development for what was before, an average sized town in West Yorkshire and is situated next to Junction 32, a popular outlet mall formerly known as Freeport.

The development contains a number of shops, restaurants, a church, and entertainment facilities including a bowling alley, multi screen cinema, laser tag, crazy golf and amusements. The cinema is one of the few Cineworld cinemas in the UK that has D-Box motion seating. It utilises complex ventilation technology. The site is served by Glasshoughton railway station on the Pontefract line (LeedsHull), opened by West Yorkshire Metro on 21 February 2005.

Xscape Braehead Renfrew

Xscape formerly had a centre in Renfrew. It was sold to Intu Properties.

References

External links

Xscape Yorkshire
Xscape Milton Keynes
Snozone – Direct link for the indoor snow slopes
Photographs of the opening day of Xscape in 2006, Braehead near Glasgow
UK Snowboard club article on Xscape MK
X-Leisure company website
Xscape project details – Clyde Waterfront Regeneration
Review of Xscape Castleford

Buildings and structures in Milton Keynes
Sports venues in Buckinghamshire
Buildings and structures in the City of Wakefield
Ski areas and resorts in England
Indoor ski resorts